The Jacksonville Giants are a professional minor league basketball team based in Jacksonville, Florida. They were the 2012, 2013, 2016, 2017, 2018, 2019 and 2021 National Champions of the new American Basketball Association (ABA), which they joined as an expansion team for the 2010–2011 season. They play most home games at VyStar Veterans Memorial Arena. In addition to their six national championships, the Giants won regional titles in 2011, 2012, and 2013. In 2014, the team was recognized for their off-the-court achievements with the ABA National Charity Award for their work in the Jacksonville community.

History

In May 2010 the American Basketball Association announced a new franchise based in Jacksonville would join the league for the 2010–2011 season. The name was announced as the Jacksonville Giants in November. The owner was Jacksonville attorney Ron Sholes, while the head coach and general manager was Kevin Waters, who previously owned and coached the Jacksonville Bluewaves of the World Basketball Association.

Jacksonville was home to an earlier ABA team, the Jacksonville Jam. The Jam played in the ABA for the 2006–2007 season before moving to the rival Premier Basketball League in 2008, but folded by the end of the season.

2010–2011

In 2010 owner Sholes stated that he hoped to avoid the fate of the Jam and other minor league basketball teams that have failed in Jacksonville with a more professional marketing strategy. He signed a contract with the city's major indoor venue, the Jacksonville Veterans Memorial Arena, to use for home games, and contracted with television and radio stations to broadcast games. The Giants debuted on December 4, 2010, defeating the San Francisco Rumble 182–124. They excelled on the court, going 23–0 in the regular season and advancing to the league playoffs, but were ultimately knocked out. They claimed an average attendance of 2000 in their inaugural season.

2011–2012

The Giants had their 2011–2012 opener on December 3, 2011, defeating the Gulf Coast Flash by 1 point on a buzzer beating 3-pointer by Shooting Guard Currye Todd on an inbound pass from former National Basketball Association player and 1992 US Dream Teamer Christian Laettner. Laettner joined the Giants for all 11 of their home games that season. The Giants played two home games at UNF Arena at the University of North Florida, and played the remaining nine at the Veterans Memorial Arena. The Giants won the 2012 ABA Championship, defeating the South Carolina Warriors 2–0 in a best-of-three series.

2012–2013

Giants finished the season with a 29–1 regular season record and hosted the ABA Final Four tournament. Giants won second ABA Championship in a row, defeating the North Dallas Vandals, from whom they received their only loss of the regular season, 2–0 in a best-of-three series.

2013–2014

Giants finish season with 29–1 record for the second straight season and advanced through the playoffs to the ABA National Championship game for the third straight season. The Giants fell to the Shreveport-Bossier Mavericks 2–0 in a best-of-three series. The first game was lost in overtime and the second was lost on a botched inbound attempt that sealed the game for the Mavericks. The 2013–2014 season saw a lot of positives for the Giants as they broke the ABA Regular Season Attendance record with 8,345 fans in attendance on February 2.

2017–2018

Finishing the season with a 19–1 record the Giants head to the ABA Final Eight in Austin, TX. In Austin, TX the Jacksonville Giants go 3-0 defeating the Steel City Yellow Jackets (125-103), the DMV Warriors (111-102) and the Austin Bats (119-114) to claim the 2018 ABA National Championship title. With this title the Jacksonville Giants complete the three-peat making this their third championship in a row and their fifth overall championship for the city of Jacksonville.

2018–2019

The Jacksonville Giants finish the regular season with a 20–1 record and head to the ABA Final 8 in St. Louis, MO. The Giants take a 129–98 win over the Steel City Yellow Jackets in the first round of playoffs and advance to the semifinals. In the semifinals the Giants take on the Syracuse Stallions and are able to pull off a 149–129 win which advanced them to the 2019 ABA National Championship game. In the championship the Jacksonville Giants get a rematch with the South Florida Gold, the only team to defeat the Jacksonville Giants in the regular season. In the regular season the Gold took down the Giants with only a 5-point lead. In the title game the Jacksonville Giants were able to redeem themselves with a 116–112 win over the South Florida Gold to claim the 2019 title. The 2019 National Championship win makes it the 6th overall title for the Giants and the 4th in a row.

2019–2020

The 2019–2020 season marks the 10th Anniversary of the Jacksonville Giants conception.

Giants Dance Team 
The Jacksonville Giants have the largest ABA dance team. Over 40 girls, ages 13 through 25, dance on two separate teams. The junior (or teenage) dance team is titled the Jacksonville Gems, while the adult dance team is called the Jacksonville Jewels.

Television 
All Jacksonville Giants home games played in the Jacksonville Veterans Memorial Arena are televised on CW17 in high-definition. Broadcaster and sports talk radio host Richard Miller formerly hosted the Giants broadcasts starting during Season One in 2010. Arley Johnson and Matt Potak are now featured on the broadcast of the Jacksonville Giants home games.

Radio 

All Jacksonville Giants home games air on WJXL 1010XL. Spencer Luthin (aka Spencer "Balls" Davis) has hosted Giants radio since December 6, 2013.

Records and recognition 

February 7, 2014 – Most Points Scored in Basketball History – 222 points

February 5, 2012 – Most Points Scored in Basketball History – 211 points

February 1, 2014 – Highest Regular Season Attendance in ABA History – 8,354.

February 19, 2016 - Highest Regular Season Attendance in ABA History – 8,987.

June 1, 2014 – National ABA Charity Award for Outstanding Service to the Community.

2015-2015 Season – ABA Team of the Year, Ron Sholes ABA Owner of the Year, Pam Masters general Manager of the year, Kevin Waters coach of the year

2018-2019 Season – Maurice Mickens received ABA Player of the Year

2011–2012 roster

2012–2013 roster

2013–2014 roster

2018–2019 roster

References 

American Basketball Association (2000–present) teams
Basketball teams in Florida
Sports teams in Jacksonville, Florida
Basketball teams established in 2010
2010 establishments in Florida